The Taoyuan Leopards are a Taiwanese professional basketball team based in Taoyuan City, Taiwan. The team is owned by J&V Energy Technology Co., Ltd and coached by Liu Chia-Fa, with Chang Chien-Wei as the general manager. The Leopards were founded in 2021 and won 0 T1 League championship.

There have been 3 head coaches for the Taoyuan Leopards franchise and haven't won any T1 League championship.

Key

Coaches
Note: Statistics are correct through the end of the 2021–22 T1 League season.

References

T1 League head coaches
Taoyuan Leopards